Little Pigeon River may refer to the following streams in the U.S. state of Michigan:

 Little Pigeon River (Mullett Lake), in Cheboygan County, flows north and west into Lake Mullett at Pigeon River Bay, at nearly the same place as the Pigeon River
 North Branch Little Pigeon River, a tributary of the Little Pigeon River
 Middle Branch Little Pigeon River, a tributary of the Little Pigeon River
 Little Pigeon River (Cheboygan County), rises in northern Otsego County and flows mostly north into Cheboygan County and into the Pigeon River
 Little Pigeon River, also known as the West Branch Pigeon River, a tributary of the Pigeon River in Huron County in the Thumb of Michigan

References

Rivers of Michigan
Set index articles on rivers of Michigan